Holmgang (holmganga in Old Norse, hólmganga in modern Icelandic, holmgång in Swedish, holmgang in Danish and Norwegian bokmål and nynorsk) is a duel  practiced by early medieval Scandinavians. It was a legally recognized way to settle disputes.

The name holmgang (literally "holm-going") may derive from the combatants' dueling on a small island, or holm, as they do in the saga of Egill Skallagrímsson.

At least in theory, anyone offended could challenge the other party to holmgang regardless of their differences in social status. This could be a matter of honor, ownership or property, demand of restitution or debt, legal disagreement or intention to help a wife or relative or avenge a friend.

Holmgangs were fought 3–7 days after the challenge. If the person challenged did not turn up for the holmgang, the other man was considered just in his challenge. If the offended party did not turn up for the holmgang, they were deemed niðingr, and could have been sentenced to outlawry. In effect, if someone was unwilling or unable to defend their claim, they had no honor. Sometimes a capable warrior volunteered to fight in the place of a clearly outclassed friend.

History

The Swedish Hednalagen, or Pagan law, a fragment from a 13th-century document from Västergötland, Sweden, stipulates the conditions for a holmgang:

Exact rules varied from place to place and changed over time, but before each challenge the duelists agreed to the rules they used. The duel was fought either on a pre-specified plot or on a traditional place which was regularly used for this purpose. The challenger recited the rules, traditional or those agreed upon, before the duel. Rules determined the allowed weapons, who was eligible to strike first, what constituted a defeat or forfeiture, and what the winner received; in Norway, the winner could claim everything the loser owned. Egils saga Skallagrímssonar 1975 (as cited in the Viking Lady Answer Page) recounted:
 

How many times the challenged actually gave in beforehand is unrecorded.

First holmgangs probably ended on the death or incapacitation of one combatant. Killing an opponent did not constitute a murder and therefore did not lead to outlawry or payment of weregeld. Later rules turned holmgang into a more ritualistic direction.

Kormakssaga states that the holmgang was fought on an ox hide or cloak with sides that were three meters long. It was staked on the ground with stakes used just for that purpose and placed in a specific manner now unknown. After that the area was marked by drawing three borders around the square hide, each about one foot from the previous one. Corners of the outermost border were marked with hazel staves. Combatants had to fight inside these borders. Stepping out of borders meant forfeiture, running away meant cowardice.

There is one reference in Kormakssaga about the sacrifice of a bull before a holmgang, but there are many references about the sacrifice the winner made after the victory. Combatants were permitted a specific number of shields (usually three) they could use – the opponent's strikes could break a shield. The challenged would strike first and then the combatants would hit each other in turn. The combat would normally end on the first blood and the winner would receive three marks of silver. This represents mainly the later Icelandic version of holmgang, which was intended to avoid unnecessary loss of life and excessive profiteering; unless the dispute was about a specific property, the most the winner could receive was the three marks of silver.

Professional duelists used holmgangs as a form of legalized robbery; they could claim rights to land, women, or property, and then prove their claims in the duel at the expense of the legitimate owner.  Many sagas describe berserks who abused holmgang in this way. In large part due to such practices, holmgangs were outlawed in Iceland in 1006, as a result of the duel between Gunnlaugr Ormstunga and Hrafn Önundarson, and in Norway in 1014.

In popular culture

In the allegorical fantasy novel Silverlock, by John Myers Myers, in the song "The Ballad of Bowie Gizzardsbane," Bowie's knife-fighting past is referred to as "the Holmgang at Natchez."

In 1957, Poul Anderson – a Danish-American who frequently used Viking themes in his writings – published the science fiction story "Holmgang" (collected in the 1982 anthology Cold Victory). The story's two protagonists – feuding spacemen of the future who are of distant Scandinavian origin and one of whom (the villain) is historically conscious – decide to revive this Viking tradition, resorting to a deadly holmgang on a lonely asteroid instead of a sea island, in order to settle their irreconcilable differences over a tangled issue involving crime, politics, and a woman's love.  Anderson's protagonist in "The Man Who Came Early," set in 10th-century Iceland, is also forced into a holmgang.

Holmgang is the name of a Norwegian TV-debate program that aired on the commercial Norwegian station TV 2 from 1992 to 2008.

In the 2001 novel Kushiel's Dart by Jacqueline Carey, the fictional Skaldic people observe the holmgang and other Norse and Teutonic traditions. One Skaldic character challenges Joscelin Verreuil to holmgang.

The film The 13th Warrior (1999) includes a holmgang process, complete with insult, shields and weregild. The book the film is based on, Eaters of the Dead, contains the same scene with more detailed explanation of both the ritual and the significance of how it is carried out. 

In the 2013 MMORPG Final Fantasy XIV: A Realm Reborn, the character class Marauder and its upgraded form Warrior has the ability Holmgang, which creates a chain that binds the user and their target together. They are immobile for the duration and must attack each other, in reference to how a real Holmgang would be conducted.

The Norwegian television series Norsemen featured a holmgang in the first episode of the series, and again in the second season.

The 2020 video game Assassin's Creed Valhalla features several holmgangs throughout its story campaign.

In 2021, Pär Hulkoff (solo Swedish metal singer-songwriter) released a single “Holmgång” for his upcoming album “Ragnarök”. The song, melodic and aggressive, ties the ancient Northern practice into modern military context.

In the 2022 film The Northman, Amleth and Fjölnir engage in Holmgang at the top of the volcano Hekla.

In the 9th season (February 12, 2022 - February 12, 2023) of the real play D&D podcast, “Dice Funk”, holmgang was introduced by the DM, Austin Yorski, through cyclops NPC, Red, and used multiple times throughout the season.

See also
Trial by combat
Duel

Notes

References
Bø, Olav. "Hólmganga and Einvigi: Scandinavian Forms of the Duel". Medieval Scandinavia 2 (1969) 132-148.
Byock, Jesse. “Hólmganga,” entry in Medieval Scandinavia: An Encyclopedia (ed. Philip Pulsiano, 1993) 289-290.
Ciklamini, Marlene. "The Old Icelandic Duel". Scandinavian Studies 35:3 (1963) 175-194.

Hermann Pálsson and Stefanie Würth, '"Holmgöngur" in der altnordischen Literatur: Historischer Gehalt und literarische Gestaltung', Amsterdamer Beiträge zur Älteren Germanistik, 41 (1995), 37ff.
Jones, Gwyn. "The Religious Elements of the Icelandic ‘Holmganga.’" Mod. Language Rev. 27:3 (1932) 307-313.
Jones, Gwyn. "Some Characteristics of the Icelandic ‘Holmganga.'" J. Eng. & Germanic Philology 32 (1933) 203-224.
Radford, R. S. "Going to the Island: A Legal and Economic Analysis of the Medieval Icelandic Duel". Southern California Law Rev. 62 (1989) 615-44.

External links
Viking Answer Lady Webpage - Hólmgang and Einvigi: Scandinavian Forms of the Duel

Dueling
Viking practices
Trials by combat
Early Germanic warfare